MAU may refer to:

 Makeup air unit, a type of air handler that only conditions outside (not recirculated) air
 Marine Amphibious Unit, a former term for a marine expeditionary unit, the smallest air-ground task force in the United States Fleet Marine Force
 Medical Assessment Unit, or acute assessment unit, a short-stay department in some British, Australian, and New Zealand hospitals that may be linked with the emergency department

Computing:
 Media Access Unit (or Multistation Access Unit), an interconnecting device used in a token ring network with a star topology
 Medium Attachment Unit, a transceiver in an Ethernet network

Entertainment:
 Massively Armored Unit, a piece in the multiplayer game RF Online.

Statistics:
 Monthly active users, a performance metric for the success of an internet product

Places:
 Mauritania, UNDP country code
 Mauritius, ITU country code
 MAU, National Rail code for Mauldeth Road railway station in Manchester, UK

Organizations
 Marathwada Agricultural University, former name of Vasantrao Naik Marathwada Krishi Vidyapeeth, an agriculture university in Parbhani, India
 Mizhnarodni Avialiniyi Ukrayiny (Ukraine International Airlines)
 Musashino Art University, a university in Kodaira, western Tokyo

Science:
 mAU is the milli-absorbance unit, or 0.001 absorbance units (AU), used to measure absorbance

See also 
 Mau (disambiguation)

de:MAU